The Euro-Mediterranean region encompasses all the European countries and the countries on the Mediterranean Rim.

Bibliography 
 Stefania Panebianco, New Euro-Mediterranean Cultural Identity, Routledge, 2003
 Daniel Müller-Jentsch, Deeper integration and trade in services in the Euro-Mediterranean region, Business & Economics,  2005

References

Regions of Europe
Mediterranean